Jarryd Goldberg (born November 13, 1985, in Livingston, New Jersey,) is an American soccer player.

Career

College
Goldberg grew up in Bernards Township, New Jersey, and attended Ridge High School in Basking Ridge, New Jersey. He played college soccer at Boston College and Boston University. While at college, Goldberg took part in the 2005 Maccabiah Games, winning a silver medal with the US team. He was named to the 2006 Jewish Sports Review Men's Soccer All-America Team.

Professional
Goldberg signed for Miami FC of the USL First Division on April 8, 2006, after impressing the coaching staff during pre-season training. On February 18, 2010, Miami FC announced the re-signing of Goldberg to a new contract for the 2010 season.

Statistics

References

External links
 Miami FC biography
 Boston College biography

1985 births
Living people
Jewish American sportspeople
Jewish footballers
American soccer players
Association football midfielders
USL First Division players
USSF Division 2 Professional League players
Boston College Eagles men's soccer players
Boston University Terriers men's soccer players
Maccabiah Games medalists in football
Maccabiah Games silver medalists for the United States
Competitors at the 2005 Maccabiah Games
Miami FC (2006) players
People from Bernards Township, New Jersey
People from Livingston, New Jersey
Ridge High School alumni
Soccer players from New Jersey
Sportspeople from Somerset County, New Jersey
21st-century American Jews